This is a list of economics films.  Economic film is a genre of film concerned with economics, typically about business, investing, and finance. It covers both fictional and documentary films.

Fictional films
 99 Homes (2014)
 Adults in the Room (2019)
 Americathon (1979)
 Arbitrage (2012)
 L'argent des autres (1978)
 Atlas Shrugged: Part I (2011)
 August (2008)
 Baazaar (2018)
 The Bank (2001)
 Barbarians at the Gate (1993; TV movie)
 A Beautiful Mind (2001)
 The Big Short (2015)
 Boiler Room (2000)
 The Bonfire of the Vanities (1990)
 Brief Season(1969)
 Buy & Cell (1988)
 Capital (2012)
 Cash McCall (1960)
 The Company Men (2010)
 Corsair (1931)
 The Crash (2017)
 Dealers (1989)
 Default (2018)
 Diamond Necklace (2012)
 Dealers (1989)
 L'Eclisse (1962)
 The Entrepreneur (2011)
 Equity (2016)
 The Guarantee (2014)
 How to Succeed in Business Without Really Trying (1967)
 The Hudsucker Proxy (1994)
 The Hummingbird Project (2018)
 The Informant! (2009)
 The Insider (1999)
 Jack Ryan: Shadow Recruit (2013)
 Limit Up (1989)
 Margin Call (2011)
 Moneyball (2011)
 Money Monster (2016)
 Other People's Money (1991)
 Owning Mahowny (2003)
 Prime Risk (1985)
 The Pursuit of Happyness (2006)
 Quicksilver (1986)
 Rocket Singh: Salesman of the Year (2009)
 Rogue Trader (1999)
 Rollover (1981)
 The Scam (2009; Korean title Jak Jeon)
 The Secret of My Success (1987)
 The Solid Gold Cadillac (1957)
 Too Big to Fail (2011; TV movie)
 Uncut Gems (2019)
 Up in the Air (2009)
 Wall Street (1987)
 Wall Street: Money Never Sleeps (2010)
 The Wheeler Dealers (1963)
 The Wizard of Lies (2017; TV movie)
 The Wolf of Wall Street (2013)
 Woman's World (1954)

Documentaries
 £830,000,000 - Nick Leeson and the Fall of the House of Barings (1996; TV documentary)
 Abacus: Small Enough to Jail (2016)
 The Big One (1996)
 Capitalism: A Love Story (2009)
 The Corporation (2003)
 Debtocracy (2011)
 The Emperor's New Clothes (2015)
 Enron: The Smartest Guys in the Room (2005)
 Floored (2009)
 The Forecaster (2014)
 Freakonomics: The Movie (2010)
 Globalisation Is Good (2003; TV documentary film)
 Heist: Who Stole the American Dream? (2011)
 Inequality for All (2013)
 Inside Job (2010)
 I.O.U.S.A. (2008)
 The Last Days of Lehman Brothers (2009; TV film)
 Let's Make Money (2008)
 Life and Debt (2001)
 Maquilapolis: City of Factories (2006)
 Marx Reloaded (2011)
 Maybe I Should Have (2010)
 Maxed Out: Hard Times, Easy Credit and the Era of Predatory Lenders (2007)
 Money for Nothing: Inside the Federal Reserve (2013)
 Moneyocracy (2012)
 The Recess Ends (2009)
 Risk/Reward (2003)
 Roger and Me (1989)
 South of the Border (2009)
 Squeezed (2007)
 Startup.com (2001)
 System Error: How Will Capitalism End? (2018)
 Wal-Mart: The High Cost of Low Price (2005)
 Who's Counting? Marilyn Waring on Sex, Lies and Global Economics (1995)
 The Yes Men (2003)
 The Yes Men Fix the World (2008)

Economics films
Films
Economics